The Wäschegrund is a river in Lower Saxony, Germany.

It then flows in a south-southwesterly direction before joining the Sperrlutter in Silberhütte.

See also
List of rivers of Lower Saxony

Rivers of Lower Saxony
Rivers of the Harz
Rivers of Germany